Aruna Ramchandra Dhere (Devanagari: अरुणा रामचंद्र ढेरे) (b. 2 Feb 1957) is a Marathi writer from Maharashtra, India. She was the President of the 92nd Akhil Bharatiya Marathi Sahitya Sammelan held at Yavatmal in 2019.

Education
 B.A. Marathi, Gold medal winner, Pune University : 1977
 Bhartiya Vidya Padvika, Tilak Vidyapeeth : 1997
 M.A. Marathi, Gold medal winner, Pune University : 1979
 Ph.D., University of Pune : 1986 (Thesis : Archetypal criticism of post independence Marathi fiction.)

Career
Aruna is the daughter of Ramchandra Chintamani Dhere. She completed a M.A and a Ph.D in Marathi literature from Pune University. She was a lecturer and producer in the Educational Media Research Center at Pune University during 1983-1988, and then had a short stint in the Maharashtra State Education Institution. 
Aruna Dhere has been a multi-disciplinary freelance writer and researcher in the field of Marathi literature, 
credited with : About 40 books covering a wide spectrum of'''
 Personal essays, short stories and novels.
 Poetry.
 Monographs.
 Children's books.
 Television - screen plays and dialogues.

Literary work
Starting around 1990, Dhere took up a full-time career as a writer. Her literary works include personal essays, short stories, novels, poems, travelogues, children’s stories, and books on sant literature, folk literature, and social history.

She has written on the lives especially of women from earlier times who rebelled against old traditions.

Some of her poems have been translated into other languages, including English.

She has written a few  television screenplays and dialogues.

Dhere has edited over a dozen publications and magazines.

She has won about thirty awards from government bodies and literary associations for her literary work.

Memberships
 Senate, University of Pune : 2003-2005
 Maharashtra Rajya Sahitya Sanskriti Mandal : 2005-till date
 State Loksahitya Samiti : 2006-till date
 Rajya Marathi Vikas Sanstha : 2006-till date

Books
The following is a partial list of Dhere's books:

वैचारिक
 अंधारातील दिवे Adharatil Dive
 उंच वाढलेल्या गवताखाली Unch vadhlelya gavatakhali
 उमदा लेखक, उमदा माणूस Umda lekhak, umda manus
 उर्वशी Urvashi
 कवितेच्या वाटेवर Kavitechya Vatevar
 काळोख आणि पाणी kalokh ani pani
 जाणिवा जाग्या होताना Janiva jagya hotana
 जावे जन्माकडे Jave janmakade
 त्यांची झेप त्यांचे अवकाश Tyanchi zep tyanche avkash
 पावसानंतरचं ऊन Pavsanantache un
 प्रकाशाचे गाणे Prakashache gane
 प्रतिष्ठेचा प्रश्न Pratishtecha prasn
 प्रेमातून प्रेमाकडे Prematun premakade
 महाद्वार Mahadwar
 लोक आणि अभिजात Lok ani abhijat
 लोकसंस्कृतीची रंगरूपे Loksanskrutichi rangrupe
 विवेक आणि विद्रोह Vivek ani vidroh
 डॉ. विश्राम रामजी घोले आणि त्यांचा परिवार Dr. VIshram ranji ghole ani tyancha parivar
 विस्मृतिचित्रे Vismrutichitre
 शाश्वताची शिदोरी Shashwtachi shidori
 शोध मराठीपणाचा (सुभाष केळकर यांच्याबरोबर सहलेखन-मुख्य लेखक- दिनकर गांगल) Shodh marathipanacha
 स्त्री आणि संस्कृती Stri ani sanskruti

कथासंग्रह
 अज्ञात झऱ्यावर Adnyat zaryavar
 काळोख आणि पाणी Kalokh ani pani
 कृष्णकिनारा Krushnkinara
 नागमंडल Nagmandal
 प्रेमातून प्रेमाकडे Prematun Premakade
 मन केले ग्वाही Man kele gwahi
 मनातलं आभाळ Manatle aabhal
 मैत्रेयी Maitreyi
 रूपोत्सव Rupotsav
 लावण्ययात्रा Lavanyyatra
 वेगळी माती, वेगळा वास Vegli mati, vegla vaas

कवितासंग्रह
 निरंजन Niranjan
 प्रारंभ Prarambh
 मंत्राक्षर Mantrakshar
 यक्षरात्र Yakshratra
 बंद अधरों से Band andhero se

Awards
Aruna Dhere has received nearly 40 Awards and Prizes from state government bodies including some coveted ones like...
 Kavi Keshavsut Prize (State Govt.)
 Balkavi Prize (State Govt.)
 Dr. Babasaheb Ambedkar Prize. (State Govt.)
 Kavi Kuaumagraj Prize by Maharashtra Sahitya Parishad
 Sahitya Samrat N C Kelkar Prize by Kesari-Maratha Sanstha)

References

1957 births
Living people
Marathi-language writers
Savitribai Phule Pune University alumni